Warne Marsh Quintet: Jazz Exchange Vol. 1, is a live album by saxophonist Warne Marsh's Quintet featuring Lee Konitz and Niels-Henning Ørsted Pedersen which was recorded at the Jazzhus Montmartre in late 1975 and released on the Dutch Storyville label.

Reception 

The Allmusic review stated "The first of three releases that document a European tour undertaken by tenor saxophonist Warne Marsh and altoist Lee Konitz finds the Lennie Tristano alumni in prime form. Marsh and Konitz often thought alike musically, and this set certainly has its exciting moments. ... Highly recommended, as are the two following volumes".

Track listing 
 "April" (Lennie Tristano) – 9:38
 "Blues by Lester" (Lester Young) – 7:44
 "Lennie-Bird" (Tristano) – 8:28
 "You Stepped Out of a Dream" (Nacio Herb Brown, Gus Kahn) – 10:10
 "Kary's Trance" (Lee Konitz) – 4:04
 "Background Music" (Warne Marsh) – 10:50
 "Subconscious-Lee" (Konitz) – 11:02 Bonus track on CD reissue
Recorded at the Café Montmatre in Copenhagen, Denmark on December 3, 1975 (track 6), December 4, 1975 (tracks 1, 5 & 7) and December 5, 1975 (tracks 2–4)

Personnel 
Warne Marsh – tenor saxophone
Lee Konitz – alto saxophone
Ole Kock Hansen – piano
Niels-Henning Ørsted Pedersen – bass
Alex Riel (track 6), Svend Erik Nørregard (tracks 1–5 & 7) – drums

References 

Warne Marsh live albums
Lee Konitz live albums
1976 live albums
Storyville Records live albums